Gino Volpe (c. 1943 - March 20, 2020) was an Italian singer-songwriter.

References

1940s births
2020 deaths
People from the Province of Potenza
Italian singer-songwriters